Sharmeen Obaid-Chinoy (born 12 November 1978) is a Canadian journalist, filmmaker and activist known for her work in films that highlight the inequality for women.

Obaid-Chinoy received her bachelor's degree in economics and government from Smith College and went on to earn two master's degrees from Stanford University. She returned to Pakistan and launched her career as a filmmaker with her first film Terror's Children for The New York Times. In 2003 and 2004 she made two award-winning films while at Stanford. Her most notable films includes, the documentaries Saving Face (2012), Song of Lahore (2015) and A Girl in the River: The Price of Forgiveness (2016), the animated 3 Bahadur films (2015-2018) and Ms. Marvel (2022).

She is the recipient of two Academy Awards, seven Emmy Awards and a Knight International Journalism Award. In 2012, the Government of Pakistan honoured her with the Hilal-i-Imtiaz, the second highest civilian honour of the country and the same year Time magazine named her one of the 100 most influential people in the world. She holds the records for being the first female film director to have won two Academy Awards by the age of 37 and the first person of Pakistani origin to be nominated for (and to win) the Academy Award for best documentary in the short subject category, and the first person of Pakistani origin to win any Academy Award. She is also the first non-US-American to win the Livingston Award for Young Journalists. The 2015 animated adventure 3 Bahadur made her the first Pakistani to make a computer-animated feature-length film. In 2017, Obaid-Chinoy became the first artist to co-chair the World Economic Forum.

Early life and background
Obaid-Chinoy was born on 12 November 1978 in Karachi, Pakistan.
Obaid-Chinoy attended Convent of Jesus and Mary, followed by schooling at Karachi Grammar School, where she was the class-fellow of Kumail Nanjiani. According to her, she was not inclined toward academics though received good grades. Upon moving to the United States for higher education, she studied at Smith College, from where she completed her bachelor's degree in Economics and Government in 2002. Later, Obaid-Chinoy received two master's degrees from Stanford University in Communication and International Policy Studies.

Career and international recognition
In 2002, Obaid-Chinoy returned to Pakistan, and launched her career as a filmmaker. In 2003 and 2004 she made two award-winning films while a graduate student at Stanford University. She then began a long association with the PBS TV series Frontline World, where she reported "On a Razor's Edge" in 2004 and went on over the next 5 years to produce many broadcast reports, online videos and written "Dispatches" from Pakistan. Her most notable films include Children of the Taliban, The Lost Generation, Afghanistan Unveiled, 3 Bahadur, Song of Lahore and the Academy Award-winning Saving Face and A Girl in the River: The Price of Forgiveness. Her visual contributions have earned her numerous awards, including the Academy Award for Best Short Subject Documentary (2012 and 2016) and the Emmy Award in the same category (2010 and 2011) and the One World Media Award for Broadcast Journalist of the Year (2007). Her films have been aired on several international channels, including the PBS, CNN, Discovery Channel, Al Jazeera English and Channel 4.

Obaid-Chinoy has also won six Emmy Awards, including two in the International Emmy Award for Current Affairs Documentary category for the films Pakistan's Taliban Generation and  Saving Face. Her Academy Award win for Saving Face made her the first Pakistani to win an Academy Award, and she is one of only 11 female directors who have ever won an Oscar for a non-fiction film. She is also the first non-American to win the Livingston Award for Young Journalists. The 2015 animated adventure 3 Bahadur made her the first Pakistani to make a computer-animated feature-length film.

In 2007, Obaid-Chinoy helped found the Citizens Archive of Pakistan, whose projects center around the preservation of Pakistan's cultural and social heritage. She also serves as the Ambassador for Blood Safety for Pakistan's national blood safety program. Obaid-Chinoy is a TED Fellow and the recipient of the Hilal-e-Imtiaz, the second highest civilian award in Pakistan Time magazine named Sharmeen in its annual list of the 100 most influential people in the world for 2012.

On 23 March 2012, Pakistan's president conferred the second highest civilian award, the Hilal-e-Imtiaz, on Obaid-Chinoy for bringing honor to Pakistan as a filmmaker. Sharmeen was ranked 37th on Desiclub.com's list of the 50 Coolest Desis of 2009. In 2012, Sharmeen Obaid-Chinoy released the 5-part series Ho Yaqeen (To Believe). In 2014, SOC Films and Sharmeen Obaid-Chinoy released Aghaz-e-Safar, a 12-episode series for Aaj News which tackled issues affecting ordinary Pakistanis across the country including child abuse, domestic violence, issues of gun violence, water scarcity, land grabbing etc.

In 2014, SOC Films released the 6-part series I Heart Karachi. On 19 April 2015, Song of Lahore, directed and produced by her and Andy Schocken, premiered at Tribeca Film Festival and was the Runner-Up to the Tribeca Audience Choice Award. In September 2015, Broad Green Pictures acquired the U.S. distribution rights to Song of Lahore announcing the release of the film in select cinemas in the U.S. In October 2015 the film was submitted for consideration in the documentary feature category for the 2016 Oscars by the Academy of Motion Picture Arts and Sciences.
Song of Lahore European premiere was at the International Documentary Film Festival Amsterdam (IDFA) from 18 to 29 November 2015. The film had its Middle Eastern premiere at the 12th Annual Dubai International Film Festival in December 2015.

On 22 May 2015, Pakistan's first animated movie, 3 Bahadur, directed by Obaid-Chinoy, a film dedicated to inculcating bravery in the youth of Pakistan, was released by Waadi Animations. The heroes of the film, Amna, Kamil and Saadi were highly anticipated, and despite being shown on only 50 screens in Pakistan, 3 Bahadur became Pakistan's highest grossing animated movie of all time, earning Rs 6.5 million and defeating the record set by Rio 2. 3 Bahadur also screened at the Montreal World Film Festival in Canada, in August 2015.

On 11 September 2015, Journey of a Thousand Miles: Peacekeepers Obaid-Chinoy's feature documentary, co-directed and produced with Geeta Gandbhir, screened at the Toronto International Film Festival 2015 for its North American premiere. The film follows the journey of three Bangladeshi women soldiers who are deployed to Haiti as part of the United Nations peacekeeping mission. The film premiered at the Mumbai Film Festival on 29 October 2015 for its Asian premiere and played at the DOC NYC Festival in November 2015.

On 15 February 2016,  Obaid-Chinoy met with the Prime Minister of Pakistan, Nawaz Sharif in Islamabad to discuss the measures required to plug the loopholes in the law which allow the perpetrators of honour killings to walk free. On 22 February 2016, the first screening of A Girl in the River: The Price of Forgiveness was held at the Prime Minister's Secretariat in Islamabad, opened by remarks made by Sharmeen Obaid-Chinoy and the Prime Minister Nawaz Sharif himself - concerning the amendments needed to prevent honour killings from occurring in Pakistan.

On 17 February 2016, the film screened at the United Nations Headquarters in New York City as part of a discussion of women and peacekeeping. The event was moderated by Stefen Feller, UN Police Adviser and was attended by a full house, including United Nations Secretary-General Ban Ki-moon and the Permanent Representative of Bangladesh, Masud Bin Momen. The documentary won the Humanitarian Award at the RiverRun International Film Festival on 21 April 2016 and also won the at the Bentonville Film Festival, dated 7 May 2016.

On 28 February 2016, A Girl in the River: The Price of Forgiveness won her a second Oscar for Best Documentary, Short Subject at the 88th Academy Awards. This is the first Oscar win for her film company SOC Films and the second Oscar for Obaid-Chinoy as Director. Later in 2017, the documentary also bagged an International Emmy Award for Best Documentary.

On 20 May 2016 Song of Lahore was released in select cinemas across New York City and Los Angeles. The cinematic release was accompanied by the release of the official soundtrack which features collaborations with artists such as Wynton Marsalis and Meryl Streep.

Obaid-Chinoy's commercial venture "Sulagta Sitara" is a documentary series which was released on ARY Digital in 2016. The series share the stories of cities in Pakistan which have experienced hardship, but still manage to shine bright through the darkness. In January 2017, she was invited to speak at the 47th World Economic Forum, and became the first ever artist to co-chair the WEF's annual meeting. This took place between 17–20 January 2017, under the theme "Responsive and Responsible Leadership". The meeting convened more than 2,500 participants from nearly 100 countries to take part in over 300 sessions. On being the first artist and Pakistani to co-chair the annual meeting Obaid-Chinoy said: "It is a great honour to be the first artist ever to be given the opportunity to co-chair the prestigious World Economic Forum at Davos in 2017. I have always believed that the true mark of any thriving society is the amount of investment made in its cultural and artistic infrastructure. There is, now, an increasing recognition of the fact that business and economics must go hand-in-hand with culture and arts for society to move forward and it is with great pride that I will be representing both the art community and my country, Pakistan!"

From 1–9 July 2017 a new work by Obaid-Chinoy - HOME1947 - was inaugurated at the Manchester International Festival. The immersive installation centres on a series of short films featuring families in India and Pakistan, who were among more than 10 million people displaced by Partition. The films see 'home' through the eyes of migrants who left their homes and never returned – 'home' as a physical place, but also as a concept, an ideal, a shared tradition. The exhibition then travelled to Mumbai in August, where it formed part of the Museum of Memories at Godrej India Culture Lab. The Pakistan premiere of Home 1947 took place in October 2017 at the Heritage Now festival in Lahore, before transferring, most recently, to Karachi in December 2017 where the exhibition managed to attract over 16,000 visitors.

Obaid-Chinoy's series of documentary films, Look But With Love, released on the Within app in October 2017, is Pakistan's first virtual reality documentary series focusing on the people of Pakistan who are striving to change the socio-political landscape of their communities through causes they are passionate about.

In November 2017, Obaid-Chinoy was awarded the 2017 Knight International Journalism Award, by the International Center for Journalists [ICFJ] in Washington, DC. The award recognises Chinoy's efforts to chronicle the human toll of extremism that have made a major impact. "At great personal risk, Obaid-Chinoy and al Masri faced terrorism head on, getting behind the scenes to chronicle untold abuses", said ICFJ President Joyce Barnathan. The Knight International Journalism Award by the ICFJ recognises media professionals who demonstrate a passionate commitment to excellent reporting that makes a difference in the lives of people around the world. For 2017, the recipients include Chinoy, whose work and efforts in highlighting the loophole on the practice of honour killing in Pakistan led to a legislative change in Pakistan.

In 2018, the Aagahi series was launched which educates women about the rights and how to navigate the police and judicial system. Aagahi has won wide acclaim with women sharing the videos and commenting on their usefulness.

In 2018, Obaid-Chinoy spoke at TED in Vancouver about the impact of mobile cinema which has been traveling across Pakistan screening films for small towns and communities in all provinces. Inculcating critical thinking and offering a wider world view to children and empowering women.

In June 2018, it was announced that the HBO Sports documentary Student Athlete, revealing the hardships endured by NCAA athletes who generate billions for their institutions, would be debuting on 2 October 2018 on the HBO network. Produced by LeBron James, Maverick Carter's SpringHill Entertainment and Steve Stoute's United Masters, the feature-length presentation is directed by Obaid-Chinoy and Trish Dalton.

In September 2019, Obaid-Chinoy unveiled her new animated film, titled Sitara: Let Girls Dream, in theaters in New York. The movie follows the story of Pari, a 14-year-old girl with dreams of becoming a pilot, while growing up in a society that does not allow her to dream. It is produced under the banner of  Obaid-Chinoy's animation company, Waadi Animations entirely in Pakistan, in association with Vice Studios and Gucci's Chime For Change. The music for the film has been composed by Emmy Award-Winning composer Laura Karpman. Recorded and mixed at the world's most famous and iconic studio, Abbey Road Studios, Karpman's score has been paramount in bringing the film's story and characters to life.

Most recently her animated mini-series Stories for children about inspiring figures in Pakistan looks at local heroes' relationships with their parents. Obaid-Chinoy is the honorary consul general for Norway in Karachi, Pakistan.

In September 2020, it was announced that Obaid-Chinoy would be co-directing the Ms. Marvel series with Adil El Arbi, Bilall Fallah and Meera Menon for Disney+ to bring Marvel Studios’ first Muslim hero to the big screen. The opportunity made her the first Pakistani director to be involved with Marvel.

In October 2022, it was reported that Obaid-Chinoy would be directing an untitled film set in the Star Wars universe, written by Damon Lindelof.

Works

Non-Fiction

Fiction

Other works

Awards and nominations

Other Achievements 
 Trustee at Smith College
 Board member of the Asian University for Women
 First artist to co-chair the World Economic Forum in 2017

See also
 List of Pakistani journalists
 Mir Zafar Ali

References

External links

 Website for Sharmeen Obaid Films
 Exclusive Interview of Sharmeen Obaid New Production 3 Bahadur with Fashioncentral
 Sharmeen Obaid-Chinoy at Women Make Movies

1978 births
Directors of Best Documentary Short Subject Academy Award winners
Karachi Grammar School alumni
Living people
Pakistani documentary filmmakers
Pakistani women journalists
Smith College alumni
Stanford University alumni
Film directors from Karachi
Pakistani Ismailis
Pakistani people of Gujarati descent
Journalists from Karachi
Canadian documentary film producers
Pakistani documentary film directors
BBC 100 Women
Emmy Award winners
Women documentary filmmakers
Livingston Award winners for International Reporting
Asia Game Changer Award winners
Pakistani animated film directors
Pakistani animated film producers
Khoja Ismailism